Adela is a female given name meaning noble or serene.

Adela is also a male name in Ethiopia. It means favours.

People named Adela include:

Pre-modern world
 Adela of Champagne (c. 1140–1206), Queen of France as the third wife of King Louis VII, later regent for her son
 Adela of Flanders(c. 1064–1115), Queen consort of Denmark by marriage to King Canute IV and Duchess of Apulia
 Adela of France (1009–1063), Duchess of Normandy and Countess of Flanders
 Adela of Hamaland (952–after 1021), sovereign Countess of Hamaland in the Netherlands
 Adela of Meissen (died 1181), Danish Queen consort, spouse of King Sweyn III of Denmark
 Adela of Milan (c. 975–after 1012), Margravine of Milan by marriage
 Adela of Normandy (1062 or 1067–1137), daughter of William I of England and sister of Henry I of England
 Adela of Pfalzel (660-c. 735), saint and founder of convent of Pfalzel

Modern world
 Lady Adela (1847–1924), Kurdish ruler of the Jaff tribe
 Adela Coit (1863–1932), German women's suffragist
 Adela Cojab (born 1996), Mexican-born Israeli activist
 Adela Cortina (born 1947), Spanish philosopher
 Adela Garcia (born 1971), IFBB Pro Fitness competitor
 Adela Helić (born 1990), Serbian volleyball player
 Adella Prentiss Hughes (1869–1950), American pianist
 Adela Jušić (born 1982), visual artist from Bosnia and Herzegovina
 Adela Micha (born 1963), Mexican journalist
 Adela Navarro Bello (born 1968), Mexican journalist
 Adela Neffa (born 1922), Uruguayan-born Argentine sculptor
 Adela Noriega (born 1969), Mexican actress
 Adela Pankhurst (1885–1961), British-Australian political activist
 Adela Peña, American violinist
 Adela Popescu (born 1986), Romanian actress and singer
 Adela Raz (born 1986), Afghan politician
 Adela Sequeyro (1901–1992), Mexican journalist, actress, filmmaker and screenwriter
 Adela Rogers St. Johns (1894–1988), American journalist, novelist, and screenwriter
 Adela Verne (1877–1952), English pianist
 Adela Vinczeová (born 1980), Slovak television presenter
 Adella Wotherspoon (1903–2004), youngest and last living survivor of the General Slocum ship disaster
 Adela Xenopol (1861–1939), Romanian feminist and writer

References 

Bosnian feminine given names